Theater Gütersloh  is a theatre for opera and drama performances in Gütersloh, North Rhine-Westphalia, Germany. The new building was designed by the architect Jörg Friedrich. It was opened in 2010.

External links

Theater Gütersloh

Theatres in North Rhine-Westphalia
Gütersloh
Buildings and structures in Gütersloh (district)